Ghost World is a 2001 black comedy film directed by Terry Zwigoff and starring Thora Birch, Scarlett Johansson, Brad Renfro, Illeana Douglas and Steve Buscemi. Based on the 1993–97 comic book of the same name by Daniel Clowes, with a screenplay co-written by Clowes and Zwigoff, the story focuses on the lives of Enid (Birch) and Rebecca (Johansson), two teenage outsiders in an unnamed American city. They face a rift in their relationship as Enid takes interest in an older man named Seymour (Buscemi), and becomes determined to help his romantic life.

The film debuted at the Seattle International Film Festival in 2001. It had little box office impact, but was critically acclaimed. It was nominated for the Academy Award for Best Adapted Screenplay and has become a cult film.

Plot
Best friends Enid and Rebecca face the summer after their high school graduation, with no plans for their future other than to find jobs and live together. The girls are cynical social outcasts, but Rebecca is more popular with boys than Enid. Enid's diploma is withheld on the condition that she attend a remedial art class. Even though she is a talented artist, her art teacher, Roberta, believes that art must be socially meaningful and dismisses Enid's sketches as nothing more than "light entertainment".

The girls see a personal ad in which a lonely, middle-aged man named Seymour asks a woman he met recently to contact him. Enid makes a prank phone call to Seymour, pretending to be the woman and inviting him to meet her at a diner. The two girls and their friend, Josh, secretly watch Seymour at the diner and make fun of him. Enid soon begins to feel sympathy for Seymour, and they follow him to his apartment building. Later they find him selling vintage records in a garage sale. Enid buys an old blues album from him, and they become friends. She decides to try to find women for him to date.

Enid has meanwhile been attending her remedial art class, and she persuades Seymour to lend her an old poster depicting a grotesquely caricatured black man, which was once used as a promotional tool by Coon Chicken Inn, the fried chicken franchise now known as Cook's Chicken, where Seymour works in corporate. Enid presents the poster in class as a social comment about racism, and Roberta is so impressed with the concept that she offers Enid a scholarship to an art college.

Seymour receives a phone call from Dana, the intended recipient of his personal ad. Enid encourages him to pursue a relationship with Dana, but she becomes unexpectedly jealous when he does so.

Enid's and Rebecca's lives start to diverge. While Enid has been spending time with Seymour, Rebecca starts working at a coffee shop. Enid gets a job at a movie theater so she can afford to rent an apartment with Rebecca, but her cynical attitude and reluctance to upsell concessions get her fired on her first day. The girls argue, and Rebecca abandons the idea of living with Enid.

When Enid's poster is displayed in an art show, school officials find it so offensive they force Roberta to give her a failing grade and revoke the scholarship. Enid turns to Seymour for solace, resulting in a drunken one-night stand. Seymour breaks up with Dana and is called to account at work when the Coon Chicken poster is publicized in a local newspaper. He unsuccessfully tries to contact Enid, only for Rebecca to tell him about Enid's prank phone call, describing the way they mocked him at the diner. Seymour is upset and goes to the convenience store where Josh works. Another customer ends up in a violent confrontation with Seymour, resulting in his being injured and hospitalized. Enid visits him in the hospital to apologize.

After everything that has occurred Enid gives in to her childhood fantasy of running away from home and disappearing. She has seen an old man, Norman, continually waiting at an out-of-service bus stop for a bus that will never come. Finally, as Enid watches from across the street, Norman boards an out-of-service bus. The next day, while Seymour discusses the summer's events with his therapist, Enid returns to the bus stop and boards the out-of-service bus when it arrives.

A post-credits scene shows an alternate version of Seymour's scene in the convenience store, in which he wins the fight and is not injured.

Cast

Production and technique
The film was directed by Terry Zwigoff with cinematography by Affonso Beato. Zwigoff and Ghost World comic creator Daniel Clowes wrote the screenplay together. Years later, Clowes admitted that writing the screenplay came with a significant learning curve. He recalled, "I started by trying to transcribe the comic into Final Draft. I figured that’s how you do an adaptation. Then I tried throwing everything away and writing an entirely new story that was very different from the book. And I synthesized those two things into a final screenplay. The actual film itself is very different from the script we wrote. We ended up jettisoning the last twenty pages and rethought the whole thing as we were filming. It was really held together by hair and spit."

Zwigoff and Clowes presented Beato with the task of making a comic book look to the movie. They asked for a fresh technique: earlier examples of the form such as X-Men and Dick Tracy were dismissed as literal-minded and "insulting" to the art form. According to Clowes, cameraman Beato "really took it to heart," carefully studying the style and color of the original comics. The final cut is just slightly oversaturated, purposefully redolent of "the way the modern world looks where everything is trying to get your attention at once."

Zwigoff also added his individual vision to the adaptation, particularly in his capture and editing of languid, lingering shots, a technique derived from his experience as a documentarian. Another notable touch is his minimal use of extras in the film, making the city and its streets intentionally empty – Clowes notes approvingly, "It captures this weird feeling of alienation in the endless modern consumer culture."

Themes

Ending and suicide theory
In a 2002 interview, Daniel Clowes and Terry Zwigoff were asked if the ending of the film adaptation was a metaphor for suicide. Daniel replied, "Yeah, it could be. It's hard to figure out why people have that response. The first time I heard that I said, 'What? You're out of your mind. What are you talking about?' But I've heard that hundreds of times". Zwigoff expanded on his views in a 2021 interview, saying: "Many interpreted it to mean Enid died by suicide [...] I personally thought of the ending as more positive: that she’s moving on with her life, that she had faith in herself".

Birch, on the other hand, stated: "Honestly, it’s a sad film, to me... I have a very dark view of where that story is leading, unfortunately".

Soundtrack

Music in the film includes "Jaan Pehechan Ho" by Mohammed Rafi, a dance number choreographed by Herman Benjamin from the 1965 Bollywood musical Gumnaam which Enid watches and dances to early in the film, and "Devil Got My Woman" by Skip James (1931), as well as "Pickin' Cotton Blues" by the bar band, Blueshammer.

There are songs by other artists mentioned in the film, including Lionel Belasco, which are reflective of the character Seymour, and of director Terry Zwigoff. Zwigoff is a collector of 78 RPM records, as portrayed by Seymour. Other tracks are by Vince Giordano, a musician who specializes in meticulous recreations of songs from old 78 RPM records.

Referenced in the film is R. Crumb & His Cheap Suit Serenaders, a band that Zwigoff played in. Enid asks Seymour about the band's second album, Chasin' Rainbows, and Seymour replies, "Nah, that one's not so great."

Missing from the soundtrack album are "What Do I Get?" by Buzzcocks, which can be heard when Enid dresses up like a punk, and the song "A Smile and a Ribbon" by Patience and Prudence.

Release
Ghost World premiered on June 16, 2001 at the Seattle International Film Festival, to lower than average recognition by audiences, but admiration from critics. It was also screened at several film festivals worldwide including the Fantasia Festival in Montreal.

Following the film's theatrical exhibition in the United States, Ghost World was released on VHS and DVD format via MGM Home Entertainment in early 2002. Additional features include deleted and alternative scenes, "Making of Ghost World" featurette, Gumnaam music video "Jaan Pehechaan Ho", and the original theatrical trailer. The film was released on Blu-ray on May 30, 2017 by The Criterion Collection, with a 4K transfer, interviews with the performers, and audio commentary.

Box office
With a limited commercial theatrical run in the United States, Ghost World'''s commercial success was minimal. The film was released on July 20, 2001 in five theaters grossing $98,791 on its opening weekend; it slowly expanded to more theaters, reaching a maximum of 128 by the end of the year. It went on to make $6.2 million in North America and $2.5 million in the rest of the world for a worldwide total of $8.7 million, just above its $7 million budget.

Reception
On review aggregator Rotten Tomatoes, the film holds an approval rating of 93% based on 164 reviews, with an average score of 7.80/10. The website's critical consensus reads, "With acerbic wit, Terry Zwigoff fashions Daniel Clowes' graphic novel into an intelligent, comedic trip through deadpan teen angst." On Metacritic, the film received a score of 89 based on 31 reviews, indicating "universal acclaim".

Roger Ebert gave the film four out of four stars and wrote:  In his review for The New York Times, A. O. Scott praised Thora Birch's performance as Enid:  In his Chicago Reader review, Jonathan Rosenbaum wrote:  However, Andrew Sarris of The New York Observer disliked the character of Enid:  Kevin Thomas, in his review for the Los Angeles Times, praised Steve Buscemi's portrayal of Seymour:  Time magazine's Andrew D. Arnold wrote: 

Michael Dean of The Comics Journal addressed the concerns of comics fans head-on: "Those with higher expectations – and, certainly, Ghost World purists – are likely to experience at least a degree of disappointment. Some of the comic's air of aimless mystery has been paved over with the semblance of a Hollywood plot, and to that extent, the movie is a lesser work than the comic. But it's still a far better movie than we had a right to expect." According to Dean: "The injection of a relatively trite plot situation into Ghost Worlds more enigmatic stream of events is perhaps forgivable, since the film might otherwise never have been produced. Its greatest sin, the misappropriation of Enid's longing, is not so forgivable, though the overlap between Zwigoff's distaste for modernity and Enid's distrust of social acceptability makes it almost palatable. In any case, we want to forgive it, because so much is right about the movie."Entertainment Weekly gave the film an "A−" rating and Owen Gleiberman wrote, "Ghost World is a movie for anyone who ever felt imprisoned by life, but crazy about it anyway." In her review for the LA Weekly, Manohla Dargis wrote, "If Zwigoff doesn't always make his movie move (he's overly faithful to the concept of the cartoon panel), he has a gift for connecting us to people who aren't obviously likable, then making us see the urgency of that connection." In Sight & Sound, Leslie Felperin wrote, "Cannily, the main performers deliver most of their lines in slack monotones, all the better to set off the script's wit and balance the glistering cluster of varyingly deranged lesser characters." In his review for The Guardian, Peter Bradshaw wrote, "It is an engaging account of the raw pain of adolescence: the fear of being trapped in a grown-up future and choosing the wrong grown-up identity, and of course the pain of love, which we all learn to anaesthetise with jobs and mundane worries." Several critics referred to the film as an art film.Ian Gordon, Mark Jancovich, and, Matthew P. McAllister, "Introduction," and, Martin Flanagan, "Teen Trajectories in Spider-Man and Ghost World." In Henry Giroux, "The Ghost World of Neoliberalism: Abandoning the Abandoned Generation." In 

Accolades

LegacyGhost World topped MSN Movies' list of the "Top 10 Comic Book Movies", it was ranked number 3 out of 94 in Rotten Tomatoes' "Comix Worst to Best" countdown (where #1 was the best and #94 the worst), ranked 5th "Best" on IGN's "Best & Worst Comic-Book Movies", and Empire'' magazine ranked the film 19th in their "The 20 Greatest Comic Book Movies" list. It is considered a cult film. It was added to the Criterion Collection in 2017.

See also
 List of films based on comics

References

External links

 
 
 
 
 
 
 Ghost World: Séance in Wowsville – an essay by Howard Hampton at The Criterion Collection

2001 films
2001 black comedy films
2001 comedy-drama films
2001 independent films
2000s American films
2000s British films
2000s buddy comedy-drama films
2000s coming-of-age comedy-drama films
2000s English-language films
2000s German films
2000s female buddy films
2000s teen comedy-drama films
American black comedy films
American buddy comedy-drama films
American coming-of-age comedy-drama films
American female buddy films
American independent films
American teen comedy-drama films
British black comedy films
British coming-of-age comedy-drama films
British female buddy films
British independent films
British teen comedy-drama films
English-language German films
Films based on American comics
Films directed by Terry Zwigoff
Films scored by David Kitay
Films set in a movie theatre
Films set in the United States
Films shot in Los Angeles
German black comedy films
German coming-of-age comedy-drama films
German independent films
German teen comedy-drama films
Live-action films based on comics
Mr. Mudd films